Paul Vixie is an American computer scientist whose technical contributions include Domain Name System (DNS) protocol design and procedure, mechanisms to achieve operational robustness of DNS implementations, and significant contributions to open source software principles and methodology.  He also created and launched the first successful commercial anti-spam service. He authored the standard UNIX system programs SENDS, proxynet, rtty and Vixie cron. At one point he ran his own consulting business, Vixie Enterprises.

Career
Vixie was a software engineer at Digital Equipment Corporation (DEC) from 1988 to 1993. After he left DEC in 1994, he founded Internet Software Consortium (ISC) in 1996 together with Rick Adams and Carl Malamud to support BIND and other software for the Internet. The activities of ISC were assumed by a new company, Internet Systems Consortium in 2004. Although ISC operates the F root name server, Vixie at one point joined the Open Root Server Network (ORSN) project and operated their L root server.

In 1995 he cofounded the Palo Alto Internet Exchange (PAIX) and, after Metromedia Fiber Network (MFN) bought it in 1999, served as the chief technology officer to MFN / AboveNet and later as the president of PAIX.

In 1998 he cofounded Mail Abuse Prevention System (MAPS), a California non-profit company with the goal of stopping email abuse.

Vixie is the author of several Request for Comments (RFC)s, including a Best Current Practice document on "Classless IN-ADDR.ARPA Delegation" (BCP 20), and some Unix software. He stated in 2002 that he "now hold[s] the record for 'most CERT advisories due to a single author.'"

In 2008, Vixie served as a judge for the Mozilla Foundation's "Download Day", an attempt to set a Guinness World Record for most downloads in a single day for a new piece of software.

Vixie served on the board of trustees of the American Registry for Internet Numbers (ARIN) from 2005 to 2013, and served as chairman in 2009 and 2010. Vixie also serves on the Security and Stability Advisory Committee of ICANN.

Vixie attended George Washington High School in San Francisco, California. He received a Ph.D. in computer science from Keio University in 2011.

In 2013, after nearly 20 years at ISC, he founded a new company,  Farsight Security, Inc. spinning off the Security Business Unit from ISC.

In 2014, Vixie was inducted into the Internet Hall of Fame as an Innovator.

Realizations
BIND
Vixie cron
DHCP
sendmail

Publications

Book

Patent
United States Patent 6,581,090, "Internet communication system," issued October 1996.

References

External links

Paul Vixie's CircleID Page

Living people
Writers from California
American computer scientists
Free software programmers
American technology writers
Computer science writers
Digital Equipment Corporation people
Unix people
American technology chief executives
American chief technology officers
Open source advocates
1963 births